Campylotes is a genus of day-flying moths of the family Zygaenidae. The genus was erected by John O. Westwood in 1840.

Species 
Species accepted within Campylotes:

 Campylotes atkinsoni Moore, 1879
 Campylotes burmana Hampson, 1919
 Campylotes desgodinsi Oberthür, 1884
 Campylotes desgodinsi ssp. splendida Elwes, 1890
 Campylotes histrionicus Westwood, 1939
 Campylotes kotzschi Röber, 1926
 Campylotes maculosa Wileman, 1910
 Campylotes minima Oberthür, 1894
 Campylotes philomena Oberthür, 1923
 Campylotes pratti Leech, 1890
 Campylotes romanovi Leech, 1898
 Campylotes sikkimensis Elwes, 1890
 Campylotes wernickei Röber, 1925

References 

Chalcosiinae
Moths described in 1840
Moth genera